Great Britain women's junior national goalball team is the women's junior national team of Great Britain.  Goalball is a team sport designed specifically for athletes with a vision impairment.  The team takes part in international competitions.

Youth world championships 

The 2005 Junior World Championships were held in Colorado Springs, Colorado.  The team was one of three teams participating, and they finished second overall.

References

National junior women's goalball teams
Great Britain at the Paralympics
G
Goalball in the United Kingdom
European national goalball teams